Vice Cooler is an American musician, music video director, and photographer.

He has been recognized by people like High Places and Henry Rollins as an "inspiration". Peaches has crowned him as the world's greatest performer.

Band history
Cooler started performing music live in 1998 with XBXRX. He drummed for the band KIT and has also guested as the live drummer for Chicks On Speed and The Raincoats.

Now he spends most of his time as a music writer and producer working with such artist as Peaches, Ladytron and Louisahhh.

Directing
 Offend Maggie by the band Deerhoof (2008)
 Front My Hope by the band Hawnay Troof (2008)
 Ear Ever Hear by the band XBXRX (2008)
 "Everything Is" by the band Hawnay Troof (2009)
 "What Dreams?" by the band Signals (2010)
 "Years Not Long" by the band Male Bonding (2010)
 Fake Drugs by the band Hollerado (2010)
 "theFUNsun" by the band Slow Animal (2010)
 "Throwing Shade" by the band Abe Vigoda (2010)
 "Candy" by the band Frankie Rose and The Outs (2010)
 "Little Trouble Girl" by the band Free Moral Agents (2010)
 "Rain" by the band KIT (2010)
 "Ambrosia" by the band KIT (2011)
 "Mud" by the singer Peaches (2011)
 "Junky for Her" by the band Cerebral Ballzy (2011)
 "A Commotion" by the band Feistodon, a collaboration between Feist and Mastodon (2012)
 "Please Be My Third Eye" by the band La Sera (2012)
 "Burst" by the singer Peaches (2012)
 "My Love Won't Wait" by the band Two Gallants (2012)
 "Untitled Echos" by the band Deerhoof (2012)
 "Lost In A Dream" by the singer Vice Cooler (2012)
 "Put A Light On" by the band Generationals (2013)
 "Atlantis" by the band STRFKR (2013)
 "City Slickers' Night Pressure" by the band Go Chic (2013)
 "Late Descent #2" by Sonic Youth member Lee Ranaldo (2014)
 "The Creature" by the band La Luz (2018)

Discography

Production and songwriting credits

References

Living people
Musicians from Mobile, Alabama
American punk rock singers
American indie rock musicians
The Raincoats members
Year of birth missing (living people)